Bard Kharan (also Romanized as Bard Kharān; also known as Bard Khvārān and Bar Dokhtarān) is a village in Javid-e Mahuri Rural District, in the Central District of Mamasani County, Fars Province, Iran. At the 2006 census, its population was 20, in 5 families.

References 

Populated places in Mamasani County